Craig Colony for Epileptics was a residential facility for epileptics in Sonyea, Livingston County, New York, US.

History
Its inspiration was the colony at Bielefeld, Westphalia, Germany. The facility was maintained by New York State appropriations. To be admitted to the Colony, the patient had to be a legal resident of New York State, and been declared epileptic by a physician. The Colony School, under the auspices of the Geneseo State Normal School, convened in 1921. The Peterson Hospital was on the premises, as were a farm, garden, and dairy. Before the facility opened, it was known as Sonyea Colony but the name was changed to Craig Colony after Oscar Craig who was serving as president of the State Board of Charities. Its name continued to change over the years: Craig Colony for Epileptics (1896), Craig Colony (1920), Craig Colony and Hospital (1951), Craig Colony School and Hospital (1966), Craig State School (1968), and Craig Developmental Center (1969). Even though there were approximately 2,000 patients at the colony in 1967, it closed its doors the following year.George Metzger of Buffalo was the architect in 1896.

See also
Asylum architecture

References

Bibliography

External links

Defunct hospitals in New York (state)
1896 establishments in New York (state)
Buildings and structures in Livingston County, New York
Epilepsy organizations
1968 disestablishments in New York (state)
Disability organizations based in the United States